Al Haymon (born April 21, 1955) is an American businessman and boxing manager. He was the manager of Floyd Mayweather Jr. and has won the Boxing Writers of America Manager of the Year Award five times.

Early life
Haymon was raised in Cleveland, Ohio, and studied economics at Harvard. He also has an MBA from Harvard.

Music career
His first career was in music promotion, where he promoted such acts as M. C. Hammer, New Edition, Whitney Houston, Janet Jackson, Mary J. Blige and Rick James. He branched out to other entertainment areas, such as when he worked with Eddie Murphy. In 1999, he sold 50% of A. H. Enterprises to SFX Entertainment.

Boxing career
Around 2000, Haymon ventured into boxing when he managed Vernon Forrest. Over the next decade, he gained considerable influence in boxing, mainly due to his connection to Floyd Mayweather Jr. In 2005 and 2013, he won the Al Buck Award (Manager of the Year) from the Boxing Writers Association of America.

Haymon founded Premier Boxing Champions, which held its first event in 2015.

Haymon is rarely seen and is almost never interviewed.

Notable client list
Fighters who are currently or were previously represented by Haymon include:

Dominic Breazeale (since 2012)
Marcus Browne (since 2012)
Sergiy Derevyanchenko (since 2014)
Joe Joyce (2018–2019)
Josesito López (since 2012)
Floyd Mayweather Jr. (since 2006)
Luis Ortiz (since 2017)
Manny Pacquiao (since 2018)
Caleb Plant (since 2014)
Guillermo Rigondeaux (since 2018)
Andy Ruiz Jr. (since 2019)
Errol Spence Jr. (since 2012)
Deontay Wilder (since 2013)
Devon Alexander
Cristobal Arreola
Jean-Pierre Augustin
Andre Berto
Adrien Broner
Brian Castaño
Chris Colbert
Danny García
Amir Khan
Austin Trout
Adonis Stevenson
Julio César Chávez Jr.
Peter Quillin
Artur Beterbiev
Hugo Centeno Jr.
Jermell Charlo
Jermall Charlo
Erislandy Lara
Gervonta Davis
Jarrett Hurd
Domonique Dolton
Lamont Peterson 
Anthony Peterson
Seth Mitchell
Gary Russell Jr.
Dominic Wade 
Antonio Tarver 
Sakio Bika 
Vernon Forrest
Leonard Bundu
Artur Szpilka
Lamon Brewster
Jermain Taylor
J'Leon Love
Omar Figueroa
Paul Williams
Léo Santa Cruz
John Molina, Jr.
Lucas Matthysse
Chris Pearson
Marcos Maidana
Keith Thurman
Paulie Malignaggi
Tugstsogt Nyambayar
Robert Guerrero
Shawn Porter
Luis Collazo
Travis Kauffman
Rances Barthelemy
Semajay Thomas
Roberto García
Kevin Bizier
Lucian Bute
Andre Dirrell
Anthony Dirrell
Andrzej Fonfara
Carl Frampton
Abner Mares
Eddie Chambers
Gerald Washington
Julian Williams
Sergey Lipinets
Mark Magsayo
Eumir Marcial

References

Living people
African-American sports executives and administrators
American sports executives and administrators
Sportspeople from Cleveland
American boxing managers
American boxing promoters
Harvard Business School alumni
1955 births
21st-century African-American people
20th-century African-American sportspeople